Yellow vetch is a common name for several plants and may refer to:

Lathyrus aphaca, native to the Middle East
Vicia lutea, native Europe, western Asia, and North Africa